The legality of the potato-firing potato cannon varies among jurisdictions.

United States

The ATF has previously examined potato guns or spud guns as devices using potatoes as projectiles and used solely for recreational purposes, do not meet the criteria of a destructive device defined by the National Firearms Act, or the Gun Control Act. They have however classified said guns as destructive devices when they used incendiary tennis balls.

According to the NFA and GCA previously mentioned, it must be muzzle loaded, not rifled, or use any projectile which is intended to be used as a weapon. Any device using compressed air would be completely exempt from both.

Several states have restricted their use beyond the federal laws, and may either prohibit or ban the possession, sale or transfer of a spud gun.

Australia

Victoria Police have attempted to charge numerous persons having a "spud gun" with possession of a Category E Firearm. In a landmark case Victoria Police v Lewis Case No. L11351952 2021 the Magistrate determined a spud gun does not fit the definition of a firearm and the charges were dismissed.

New Zealand

Pneumatic spud guns are classed as air guns in New Zealand, which means the owner must be either over 18, or over 16 with a A-Category Arms License. Combustion cannons are deemed a firearm, requiring the owner to hold an A-Category License. These laws are rarely, if ever applied and spud gun ownership and building has proved a popular hobby with many New Zealanders.

The Netherlands

All combustion spud guns are considered firearms.

Germany

In Germany, a spud gun does not differ legally from any other firearm (for ones that use combustion to propel the projectile) or air rifle. The manufacture, acquisition and possession is therefore subject to the same requirements as for any other weapon of the same category. Since there is no known model developed before 1871, which would classify that model as an antique, spud guns are not subject to the eased regulations regarding antique weapons. Therefore any non-combusting spud gun with a maximum projectile energy of 7.5 joules can be owned by anyone without a license, while their manufacture still requires one. The legal possession of any other such weapon requires a gun license.

Canada
A spud gun is not considered a firearm unless it fires a projectile faster than 152.4 meters per second and at a muzzle energy exceeding 5.7 Joules based on the definition of a firearm in the Canadian Criminal Code. A spud gun may be interpreted as an imitation firearm, and therefore it would be illegal to have it in possession in a public place.  The spud gun would most likely be considered a dangerous weapon, and therefore if an offense is committed with it, a possession of a dangerous weapon charge could be issued.
If the air powered spud gun has soft ammunition (potatoes) that splatter or bounce on impact and is kept under 100psi the spud gun is perfectly legal.

Poland
Pneumatic spud guns are subject to the same laws as air guns, i.e. they are not classified as weapons if their muzzle energy is below 17 joules. Combustion spud guns are considered firearms.

Other notes
Flaming, explosive, black powder, or living projectiles can often make a legal spud gun illegal in many jurisdictions.
Many heavily populated areas have ordinances on projectiles and loud noise.
While combustion cannons may be legal in a given area, stun guns, sometimes used for ignition, are illegal in some states.

References

External links

Pneumatic weapons